The sport climbing competition at the World Games 2013 took place from August 3 to August 4, in Cali in Colombia, at the Velodrome Exterior. 68 sportsmen from 21 nations participated in the event.

Schedule 
All times are in Colombia Time (UTC-05:00).

Saturday, 3 August 2013
17:30 Men's Speed qualification
18:00 Women's Speed qualification
20:12 Men's & Women's Speed final

Sunday, 4 August 2013
08:30 Men's & Women's Lead semifinal
13:10 Men's & Women's Lead final

Participating nations

 Austria (6)
 Canada (2)
 Chile (1)
 China (2)
 Colombia (4)
 Czech Republic (1)
 Ecuador (1)
 France (7)
 Germany (1)
 Indonesia (1)
 Italy (1)
 Norway (1)
 Poland (4)
 Russia (15)
 Slovenia (2)
 South Korea (3)
 Spain (1)
 Sweden (1)
 Ukraine (3)
 United States (3)
 Venezuela (8)

Medalists

Medals table

References

External links
 Results book

2013 World Games
Sport climbing at the World Games
2013 in sport climbing